Byram may refer to:

Places 
England
 Byram, North Yorkshire
United States
 Byram, Connecticut
 Byram, Mississippi
 Byram, New Jersey in Hunterdon County
 Byram Center, New Jersey in Sussex County
 Byram Township, New Jersey in Sussex County
 Byram Hills High School in Armonk, New York
 Byram River in New York and Connecticut

People 
 Byram (surname), includes a list of people with the surname

Events 
 Byram v. United States, a US federal tax law court decision
 Battle of Byram's Ford, US Civil War battle

Geology 
 Byram Formation in Alabama
 Byram Marl, a formation in Mississippi